A hockey stick graph or hockey stick curve is a graph, or curve shape, that resembles an ice hockey stick, in that it turns sharply from a nearly flat "blade" to a long "handle".  

In economics,
marketing,
and dose–response relationships,
a hockey stick graph is one in which the "blade" is near zero (hugging the floor) before the graph turns upward to a long nearly straight increasing section.  By contrast, in climate science, the well-known hockey stick graph (global temperature) describing 1000  years of global or hemispheric temperature has the "handle" horizontal and "blade" turning upward.  This difference of viewpoint is remarked on in a 2020 novel about climate change:

See also

 Hockey stick graph (global temperature)

References

Graphs